Bastion Bunglow is a famous tourist site in the city of Kochi, located near Vasco da Gama square in Fort Kochi, India. Currently, it is the official residence of the Sub-Collector. Bastion Bunglow is an example of Indo-European style architecture mainly following the Dutch style.
Bastion Bungalow,  is a sea-facing Dutch heritage structure built in 1667. Bastian Bungalow had been used as a residential building during the British period. Colonel Macaulay, the resident of Cochin during the early decade of the 19th century stayed in this building.

Etymology
The name Bastion Bunglow is derived from its location on the site of the Stromberg Bastion of the old Dutch fort.

References

cultural mapping

Buildings and structures in Kochi